Vaia Dirva  (born ) is a retired Greek female volleyball player, who played as a middle blocker. She was part of the Greece women's national volleyball team at the 2002 FIVB Volleyball Women's World Championship in Germany. On club level, she played most notably for Olympiacos.

References

External links
profile at greekvolley.gr
profile at fivb

1977 births
Living people
Greek women's volleyball players
Olympiacos Women's Volleyball players
Place of birth missing (living people)
Mediterranean Games silver medalists for Greece
Mediterranean Games medalists in volleyball
Competitors at the 2005 Mediterranean Games
21st-century Greek women